Kirill Aleksandrovich Varaksin (born 3 August 1974) is a Latvian and Russian former professional footballer who played as striker or midfielder.

Career
He played for Jeju United then known as Yukong Elephants, in the K League

References

External links
 

1974 births
Living people
Russian footballers
Latvian footballers
Association football midfielders
Association football forwards
Ukrainian Premier League players
Russian Premier League players
K League 1 players
FC Metalurh Zaporizhzhia players
FC Chernomorets Novorossiysk players
FC KAMAZ Naberezhnye Chelny players
Jeju United FC players
SV Wilhelmshaven players
1. FC Saarbrücken players
K. Sint-Niklase S.K.E. players
FK Rīga players
FK Daugava (2003) players
Russian expatriate footballers
Russian expatriate sportspeople in Ukraine
Expatriate footballers in Ukraine
Russian expatriate sportspeople in South Korea
Expatriate footballers in South Korea
Russian expatriate sportspeople in Belgium
Expatriate footballers in Belgium
Russian expatriate sportspeople in Germany
Expatriate footballers in Germany